was a Japanese football player and manager. He played for Japan national team.

Club career
Shimatani was born in Kyoto on November 6, 1938. After graduating from Kansai University, he joined Furukawa Electric in 1961. In 1965, Furukawa Electric joined new league Japan Soccer League and he played in 1 season in the league. After he left the club, he played for his local club Kyoto Shiko.

National team career
On January 11, 1959, when Shimatani was a Kansai University student, he debuted for Japan national team against Singapore.

Coaching career
Shimatani managed his local club Kyoto Shiko (later Kyoto Purple Sanga) in 1972. 1972 season is first season Kyoto Shiko was promoted to new division, Japan Soccer League Division 2 from Japanese Regional Leagues. He managed until 1974. In 1977, he managed for Kyoto Shiko again. However, in 1978 season, the club was relegated to Regional Leagues. He resigned in 1978. In 1994, he signed with Kyoto Purple Sanga. He resigned in September.

On October 24, 2001, Shimatani died of cirrhosis in Kyoto at the age of 62.

Club statistics

National team statistics

References

External links
 
 Japan National Football Team Database

1938 births
2001 deaths
Kansai University alumni
Association football people from Kyoto Prefecture
Japanese footballers
Japan international footballers
Japan Soccer League players
JEF United Chiba players
Kyoto Sanga FC players
Japanese football managers
Kyoto Sanga FC managers
Association football midfielders
Deaths from cirrhosis